TBWA Worldwide is an international advertising agency whose main headquarters are in Midtown Manhattan, New York City, United States.

Since 1993, the agency has been a unit of Omnicom Group, the world's second largest advertising agency holding company.

History
TBWA was founded in 1970 in Paris, France, by William G. Tragos (Greek-American, Management), Claude Bonnange (French, Marketing), Uli Wiesendanger (Swiss, Creation), and Paolo Ajroldi (Italian, Client Services). The first letter of each founder's name provided the initials for the new organization. They were purchased by the Omnicom Group in 1993.

In the mid-1990s TBWA began expanding globally spreading rapidly. It began acquiring global accounts such as Master Foods that helped strengthen the breadth and depth of its offering, so much so that in 2004 it was named by Advertising Age as Global Agency Network of the Year. 

In 2010, it was named by Advertising Agency as one of the top ten agencies of the Decade.

TBWA\Worldwide has been named Adweek's Global Agency of the Year for 2018, 2018, and 2021. TBWA\Worldwide was added to Fast Company's list of the World's Most Innovative Companies in 2019.

International operations
In the United States, TBWA operates through TBWA\Chiat\Day, with offices in Los Angeles, New York City and Nashville. In other parts of the world the company also operates under a mixed brand name such as TBWA\Hunt\Lascaris, a highly awarded agency based in South Africa, TBWA\CONCEPT UNIT, West Africa's most awarded creative agency based in Nigeria, TBWA\HAKUHODO, the second largest creative agency in Japan after Dentsu, TBWA\RAAD an emerging operation that spans the Middle East and North Africa. The Asia Pacific regional operations was split into three regions – Asia, Oceania and Greater China – and headquarters moved from Hong Kong to Singapore. Its network also expands throughout Latin America. An example of one of its prominent links is Brands&People, a design and advertising agency in Monterrey.

Within Omnicom Group 
Within the Omnicom Group of Companies, TBWA is generally partnered with OMD and PHD for Media solutions, TEQUILA for below the line marketing communications, Ketchum and Gavin Anderson for Public Relations and Investor Relations, and Agency.com for interactive. That said, in specific markets it partners or works with other Diversified Agency Services (DAS) agencies within Omnicom's portfolio.

Disruption and Media Arts
TBWA has a philosophy called the disruption and Media Arts created by Jean-Marie Dru when he was in BDDP (French advertising agency now called BDDP&Fils) the May 1st of 1992.

This philosophy is outlined in several books by Jean-Marie Dru, such as "Disruption", "How Disruption Brought Order", and "Beyond Disruption: Changing the Rules in the Marketplace."

Controversies

Absolut Vodka controversy
In April 2008, Teran/TBWA of Mexico released a controversial advertisement for Absolut Vodka depicting a tongue-in-cheek fictional "perfect world" dubbed "absolut world" depicting the larger Mexico as it existed before the 19th century Mexican–American War, which includes areas now part of the United States (including California and Texas). Some time after the billboard was taken down in Mexico City, a photo of it surfaced on a right-wing blog in the US, sparking a short uproar among elements of the media.

Pincha la Rueda de Hamilton
Pincha la Rueda de Hamilton (Burst Hamilton's tires), a Spanish website run by TBWA, was set up in October 2008. It hosted a game where users could leave objects on a race track to stop the then Formula One leader, Lewis Hamilton, from winning the last grand prix of the year in Brazil. It became controversial when users began to leave racist comments (such as "half-breed") aimed at the mixed-race Hamilton and was shut down in November. The FIA, the sport's governing body, and Hamilton's team, McLaren, condemned the comments as "abusive and hateful".

Taco Bell Chihuahua
In 1997 TBWA developed the Chihuahua campaign for Taco Bell. Two Michigan men, represented by Warner Norcross & Judd LLP, who had earlier pitched the concept to Taco Bell sued and in 2003 a jury awarded them US$30 million in damages and a judge tacked on US$12 million in interest. Taco Bell in turn sued TBWA saying it should have been aware of the conflicts. In 2009 a three-judge federal appeals panel ruled against Taco Bell.

Häagen-Dazs India
In December 2009, TBWA developed the campaign for Häagen-Dazs Ice Cream in India. Several banners were put up that said, "Exclusive Preview for International Travelers - Access restricted only to holders of international passports". Instead of portraying exclusivity, this was perceived negatively due to India's long history of colonialism where access to certain areas was restricted to the white colonizers from Britain. Häagen-Dazs cut ties with TBWA after the negative publicity generated due to that incident.

See also

Lürzer's Archive

References

Advertising agencies of the United States
Advertising agencies based in New York City
Marketing companies established in 1970
Economy of Los Angeles
1993 mergers and acquisitions
1970 establishments in France